Mugodzhar Hills (Mūğaljar tauy) or Mugodzhar Range is a series of mountain ranges 275 miles (440 km) long in the Aktobe Region of northwestern Kazakhstan. They are considered to be a continuation of Ural Mountains and connected with Southern Ural by Guberlin Mountains (Губерлинские горы). They form the divide between the Caspian Sea and Aral Sea basins.

The Mughodzhary proper are of length about 200 km  with width up to 30 km. They start at the Or River (река Орь) as a narrow range that further splits in two: Eastern Mugodzhary and Western Mugodzhary. The highest place (657 metres) is at Eastern Mygodzhars, Mount Boktybay (Boqtybay, Боктыбай). Major rivers that run from Mughodzhary are Or River, Emba River and Irgiz River.

In a wider sense, Mughodzhary also include a number of other highlands and hillocks,  in particular, Ural-Tobolsk Plateau, and the Northern Mughodzhary, which actually connect with Guberlinskiy hillocks.

References 

Mountain ranges of Kazakhstan
Ural Mountains
Geography of Aktobe Region